The World Junior Alpine Skiing Championships 2006 were the 25th World Junior Alpine Skiing Championships, held between 2–7 March 2006 in Québec, Canada.

Medal winners

Men's events

Women's events

External links
World Junior Alpine Skiing Championships 2006 results at fis-ski.com

World Junior Alpine Skiing Championships
2006 in alpine skiing
Alpine skiing competitions in Canada
2006 in Canadian sports
Skiing in Quebec